The 15 cm schwere Feldhaubitze M. 15 was a heavy howitzer used by Austria-Hungary in World War I. Austrian and Czech guns were taken into Wehrmacht service after the Anschluss and the occupation of Czechoslovakia as the 15 cm schwere Feldhaubitze 15(t) or (ö).

The M. 15 was adapted from a fortress turret howitzer called the 15 cm Turmhaubitze M15 designed to throw the same ammunition as the schwere Feldhaubitze M.14 some  further. It didn't normally breakdown for transport, but could be disassembled into four loads for transport in mountainous areas.

The first five weapons were delivered in the first half of 1916. A total of 57 barrels and 56 carriages were completed by the end of the war.

The Finns purchased twenty weapons after the end of the Winter War. They arrived on the SS Widor on 9 October 1940. They were initially issued to Heavy Artillery Battalions 21, 22 and 28. They were unpopular with the field artillery as they were thought to be too heavy and were withdrawn from field duty during the Continuation War. Some went to equip the Maaselkä Fortification Artillery Battalions.

References 
 Gander, Terry and Chamberlain, Peter. Weapons of the Third Reich: An Encyclopedic Survey of All Small Arms, Artillery and Special Weapons of the German Land Forces 1939-1945. New York: Doubleday, 1979 
 Ortner, M. Christian. The Austro-Hungarian Artillery From 1867 to 1918: Technology, Organization, and Tactics. Vienna, Verlag Militaria, 2007

External links 

 Finnish howitzers on jaegerplatoon

Notes 

World War I howitzers
World War I artillery of Austria-Hungary
150 mm artillery